Sao Shwe Thaik (Tsaw³ Kham⁴soek³; , ; 16 October 1895 – 21 November 1962) was a Burmese politician who served as the first president of the Union of Burma and the last Saopha of Yawnghwe. His full royal title was Kambawsarahta Thiri Pawaramahawuntha Thudamaraza. He was a well-respected Shan political figure in Burma. His residence in Nyaung Shwe (Yawnghwe), the Haw, is now the "Buddha Museum" and is open to the public.

Early life
Born on 16 October 1895 of the British Raj, Shwe Thaik was educated at the Shan Chiefs School in Taunggyi. He then entered British military service during World War I, and also served in the Northeast Frontier Service from 1920–1923. In September 1927, he was chosen as successor to his uncle as saopha of Yawnghwe by the Federated Shan States' Council of Ministers. He officially assumed office on 8 March 1929. He again served in the military service from 1939 to 1942. He was married five times; his best-known wife was the first, Sao Nang Hearn Hkam, sister of the Saopha of North Hsenwi Sao Hom Hpa. He had a total of three children.

President
Sao Shwe Thaik became the president of the Union of Burma on 4 January 1948 at its independence, served as the head of state until 16 March 1952. The following is his first presidential address to the nation on the day of independence, 4 January 1948.

Let us rejoice at the independence which has come to us today, the result of sacrifices undergone by us and those who preceded us in the years that have passed. Let us rejoice also that the independence has come not as a result of armed conflict but as the fruit of friendly negotiations with that great nation whose political bonds we replace by mutual consent to-day with the stronger bonds of friendship and goodwill.

Today is for us not only a day of freedom but also a day of reunion. For a long time, the principal races of Burma, the Kachins and the Chins have tended to look upon themselves as separate national units. Of late, a nobler vision, the vision of a Union of Burma, has moved our hearts, and we stand united to-day as one nation determined to work in unity and concord for the advancement of Burma’s interests and for the speedy attainment of her due position as one of the great nations of the world. It is unity which has brought our struggle for independence to this early fruition and may unity continue to be the watchword for every member of the Sovereign Independent Republic to be henceforth known as the Union of Burma.

Excerpt from "the White Umbrella" by Patricia Elliot (Pg. 206–207)
On 4 January 1949, a mass rally was held outside City Hall to mark the first anniversary of Independence Day. As head of state, (he) addressed the crowd. To his credit, he didn't serve up the previous year's menu of brave words and high purpose. Instead he issued a warning.

Co-operation and understanding cannot come about so long as the element of violence or threat of violence exists, for violence has no counterpart in freedom, and liberty ends where violence begins. The progressive retreat of democracy in the world today is mainly due to the worship by nations of the cult of physical force. The deterioration in this direction has been such that the much-vaunted democracies are nowadays hardly distinguishable from totalitarian states. 

He made a direct stab at his own country's deteriorating political situation with insurgencies and armed conflicts.

Speaker of the Chamber of Nationalities
After this term as president, he was the speaker of the Chamber of Nationalities, the upper house, from 1950 to 1962. In the military coup of March 1962 he was arrested by the Union Revolutionary Council headed by General Ne Win and died in prison in November 1962. One of his sons, 17 at that time, was killed in the March 1962 military coup, apparently the only casualty on the day of the coup.

Notes

References

 The Union of Burma: A Study of the First Years of Independence By Hugh Tickner. New York: Oxford University Press, 1957. xiv, 424. Maps, Bibliography at page 24

Bibliography

External links
 Leaders of Myanmar (Burma)
 Sao Shwe Thaik's speech on Burmese independence, 4 January 1948

1895 births
1962 deaths
Presidents of Myanmar
Burmese people who died in prison custody
Prisoners who died in Burmese detention
Anti-Fascist People's Freedom League politicians
People from Shan State
Recipients of the Order of the Union of Myanmar
Burmese people of Shan descent
Yawnghwe
Burmese military personnel of World War II